Tchahagir (Ջահակիր in Armenian) is an Armenian-language bi-weekly published in Cairo, Egypt, by the Social Democrat Hunchakian Party.

History
Published since 5 May 1948, as a bi-weekly, four years later it became a monthly, then a journal. Second period of publication started on 7 November 1963 (3000 copies each issue). Tchahagir included 8, then 6, then 4 pages. Tchahagir was published by Aida Serovbian and Sargis Balayan, and its literary section was edited by Armen Dadour. Haig Jamgochian, Arsham Dadrian (1948–1955) and Avedis Movsesian were among the editors of Tchahagir. Currently the editorial advisor is Haig Avakian and the editor-director is Mardiros Balayan (since 1993). 

From January 2001 to January 2008 it also issued the Dzidzernag musical supplement in Armenian (four issues in a year). The editor was Haig Avakian.

References

External links
Tchahagir
Tchahakir Armenian Weekly
Jahakir at Worldcat
100 years of Armenian media in Egypt
Electronic library of Tchahagir
Electronic library of Dzidzernag

1948 establishments in Egypt
Armenian diaspora in Egypt
Armenian-language newspapers
Non-Arabic-language newspapers published in Egypt
Publications established in 1948
Newspapers published in Cairo
Weekly newspapers published in Egypt
Social Democrat Hunchakian Party